Lucille Hutton (1898 – 1979) was an American film actress of the silent era.  She appeared in 56 films between 1916 and 1931.

Hutton was born in Los Angeles, California, and attended Sacred Heart Academy there. Before working in films, she performed on stage in Los Angeles with the Morosco Stock Company and in vaudeville on the Keith and Orpheum circuits. 

Hutton's first feature film was The Miracle Man (1919). She appeared opposite Bobby Vernon in a series of comedy films.

Hutton married Donald Carlos Jacobson in March 1929 in Honolulu. They were divorced on August 26, 1930, and on August 27, 1930, she married George G. Buckingham. She filed for divorce from Buckingham on February 21, 1931.

Selected filmography

 The Miracle Man (1919)
 The Last Outlaw (1919)
 Ladies Must Live (1921)
 The Village Blacksmith (1922)
 East Side - West Side (1923)
 The Buster (1923)
 Desire (1923)
 The Breathless Moment (1924)
 Wine of Youth (1924)
 The Sunset Trail (1924)
 Dick Turpin (1925)
 The Winner (1926)
 Listen Lena (1927)

References

External links

1898 births
1979 deaths
Actresses from Indiana
American film actresses
American silent film actresses
20th-century American actresses
Actresses from Los Angeles
American stage actresses
Vaudeville performers